Line 1 of the Dalian Metro (M1) is a rapid transit line running from north to south in central Dalian. It was first opened on 30 October 2015.

History
The line was built in phases, with the 13-station first phase, running from Yaojia to Fuguo Street, opening on 30 October 2015. The line was extended to Convention & Exhibition Center on 29 January 2016 and Hua'nan North station was opened on 1 June 2017.
The second phase of the line, which consisted of the eastward extension of the line from Convention & Exhibition Center to Hekou, opened on 7 June 2017. In October 2017, most station names were re-translated from Pinyin into conventional English.

Opening timeline

Service routes
  —

Stations

References

01
Railway lines opened in 2015
2015 establishments in China